Uster is a railway station in Switzerland, situated in the city of Uster. The station is located on the Wallisellen to Uster and Rapperswil railway line.

History 
Between 1909 and 1949, Uster station was also the terminus of the Uster-Oetwil-Bahn (UOeB), a metre gauge electric tramway that linked Uster with Esslingen and Oetwil in the Zürcher Oberland.

An unusual feature of Uster railway station is the historic lok remise or engine shed. This comprises two separate buildings, a simple shed from 1856 and a partial roundhouse from 1857, arranged around a turntable. The roundhouse is flanked by houses on either side. The whole ensemble has been designated as a historical monument since 1985, and has been restored to its original condition. It is inscribed on the Swiss Inventory of Cultural Property of National Significance. It is owned by the Canton of Zurich, and used by the Dampfbahn-Verein Zürcher Oberland to maintain its collection of historic rolling stock.

In 2018, parts of the Uster station were rebuilt so that barrier-free access to all trains of the Zurich S-Bahn is possible.

Services 
Uster station is served by Zürich S-Bahn routes S5, S9, and S15, operating via Zürich Stadelhofen, and by route S14, operating via Wallisellen and Zürich Oerlikon. The S9 terminates at Uster, whilst the S14 continues to Hinwil, and the S5 and S15 continue to Pfäffikon SZ and Rapperswil, respectively. During weekends, there are also two nighttime S-Bahn services (SN5, SN9) offered by ZVV.

Summary of all S-Bahn services:

 Zürich S-Bahn:
 : half-hourly service to  via , and to  via .
 Nighttime S-Bahn (only during weekends):

Gallery

References

External links 

 
Interactive station plan (Uster)

Uster
Uster
Uster